Alice Chalifoux (January 22, 1908 – July 31, 2008) was the principal harpist with the Cleveland Orchestra from 1931 to 1974 and was its only female member for twelve years. Chalifoux learned to play the harp from her mother, studying music at local schools before studying under Carlos Salzedo at the Curtis Institute of Music. She was an authority on his music and inherited the Salzedo Summer Harp Colony after his death. She had a reputation as a specialist in orchestral harp technique and a master teacher. She taught at the Cleveland Institute of Music, the Oberlin Conservatory of Music, and the Baldwin-Wallace Conservatory of Music. She continued teaching harp until her death in 2008, at the age of 100. Chalifoux received two honorary degrees for her work. In her personal life, Chalifoux married John Gordon Rideout in 1937 and had one daughter.

Education
Chalifoux was the youngest of four children born to the merchant and violinist Oliver Chalifoux and his wife, harpist Alice Hallé Chalifoux, in Birmingham, Alabama. After learning to play from her mother and continuing as a music student in local schools, Chalifoux was accepted as a student of Carlos Salzedo at the Curtis Institute of Music in Philadelphia, Pennsylvania. She inherited Salzedo's house and the Salzedo Summer Harp Colony after his death in 1961. She received two honorary degrees in the early 1990s: a doctor of fine arts from Bowdoin College and a doctor of musical arts from the Cleveland Institute of Music.

Career
Through her work with the Cleveland Orchestra, under the direction of conductors such as Erich Leinsdorf, Artur Rodziński, George Szell, Pierre Boulez, and Lorin Maazel, Chalifoux quickly became recognized as a specialist in orchestral technique. Her recording of Debussy's Danses sacrée et profane with the Cleveland Orchestra received a Grammy Award in 1996. She was the principal harpist for the Cleveland Orchestra from 1931 to 1974. A lack of accommodations for women led her to change clothes inside of her harp trunk when necessary. She was reportedly accepted by her male colleagues at the Cleveland Orchestra, respected as a great harpist, and did her own harp repairs.

Chalifoux was known as a strong advocate of the method for the harp developed by Salzedo, and earned a reputation as a master teacher through many years of teaching at the Cleveland Institute of Music, the Oberlin Conservatory of Music, and the Baldwin-Wallace Conservatory of Music. Well-known as an authoritative coach in Salzedo's music, she also had strengths in helping solve fingering problems, and identifying and correcting physical problems in playing. Her editing of orchestra parts was invaluable to her profession. Chalifoux was the primary instructor at the Salzedo Summer Harp Colony, in Camden, Maine, after the death of Salzedo in 1961. The harp colony was considered the "harp center of the universe". Both beginners and established harpists would travel to Camden to study under Chalifoux. 

Chalifoux was once a guest on The Tonight Show Starring Johnny Carson.

Personal life
Chalifoux married John Gordon Rideout in 1937 and had a daughter, Alyce. Her husband died in 1951. Chalifoux continued to teach harpists until she died in 2008 at the age of 100.

Students
According to Kraus's book on the Cleveland Orchestra under George Szell, she considers Chalifoux one of the best harpists and harp teachers from the United States. Her students continue to hold posts with major orchestras and important teaching positions.
 Ann Hobson Pilot, Boston Symphony Orchestra, New England Conservatory, Boston University, Tanglewood 
 Yolanda Kondonassis, Oberlin Conservatory, Cleveland Institute of Music, major recording artist for Telarc
 Jacquelyn Bartlett, Indianapolis Symphony Orchestra, North Carolina Symphony, University of North Carolina School of the Arts, Fire Pink Trio
 Anna Maria Mendieta, Sacramento Philharmonic 
 Doug Rioth, San Francisco Symphony
 Alice Giles, International soloist, first prizewinner in the 8th Israel International Harp Competition
 Mary Bircher, Omaha Symphony Orchestra, University of Nebraska-Lincoln
 Anastasia Pike, Peabody Institute of The Johns Hopkins University, James Madison University, and Teachers College, Columbia University
 Elisabeth Remy Johnson, Principal Harpist, Atlanta Symphony Orchestra
 Trina Struble, teacher's chair in the Cleveland Orchestra
 Lisa Wellbaum, Chalifoux's successor as principal harp in Cleveland

References

Further reading
Pike, Anastasia (2008).  Alice Chalifoux: a Centenarian's Legacy.  The American Harp Journal.  Summer 2008.
Alice Chalifoux papers, L. Tom Perry Special Collections, Harold B. Lee Library, Brigham Young University
Rosenberg, Donald (2000). The Cleveland Orchestra Story: "Second to None". Gray & Company, Publishers.

American classical harpists
1908 births
2008 deaths
Grammy Award winners
American centenarians
American music educators
American women music educators
Musicians from Birmingham, Alabama
Musicians from Cleveland
Cleveland Institute of Music faculty
20th-century American musicians
21st-century American musicians
20th-century classical musicians
20th-century American women musicians
21st-century American women musicians
Women centenarians
American women academics
Harold B. Lee Library-related music articles